Christian Jobin (born April 7, 1952) is a Canadian politician and was the Member of Parliament (MP) for the district of Lévis-et-Chutes-de-la-Chaudière from 2003 to 2004. He has been a Liberal.

Jobin was the mayor of St-Étienne-de-Lauzon from 1993 to 2001.  He ran in the 1998 provincial election in  Chutes-de-la-Chaudière, but was defeated.  He also ran for mayor in Lévis in 2001 but he was defeated by Jean Garon.

In 2003, Jobin won a by-election and became a Member of Parliament.  In 2004 though, the number of Liberal MPs from Quebec significantly decreased and Jobin lost the merged seat of Lévis—Bellechasse to Bloc Québécois candidate Réal Lapierre.
He is a former accountant, and is married with 5 children.

References

External links
 

1952 births
Living people
Liberal Party of Canada MPs
Members of the House of Commons of Canada from Quebec
21st-century Canadian politicians